Battle of Los Angeles (2023) was the 17th Battle of Los Angeles professional wrestling tournament produced by Pro Wrestling Guerrilla (PWG). It was a two-night event on January 7 and 8, 2023, at the Globe Theatre in Los Angeles, California.

The tournament marked the PWG debuts of Michael Oku, Shun Skywalker, El Hijo del Vikingo, SB Kento and Bryan Keith as well as the surprise PWG debut of Chris Jericho. Mike Bailey won the Battle of Los Angeles tournament by defeating Konosuke Takeshita in the final. Two non-tournament matches took place on the second night. In the first match, Black Taurus and Latigo defeated Aramis and Rey Horus. The second match was a ten-man tag team match in which Jericho Appreciation Society (Chris Jericho, Daniel Garcia, Angelo Parker, Matt Menard and Sammy Guevara) defeated Jonathan Gresham, Kevin Blackwood, Michael Oku, Player Uno, and SB Kento.

Background
On November 22, 2022, PWG announced via its official Twitter handle that the 2023 Battle of Los Angeles tournament would take place on January 7 and January 8, 2023. The following participants were announced to participate in the tournament: Michael Oku, Shun Skywalker, Masha Slamovich, "Speedball" Mike Bailey, Komander, Alex Shelley, Jonathan Gresham, Aramís, Titus Alexander, Jordynne Grace, Lio Rush, Black Taurus, Latigo, 2022 winner and the World Champion Daniel Garcia, 2019 winner Bandido, Konosuke Takeshita and El Hijo del Vikingo.

On December 14, PWG tweeted that Bailey would be unable to compete in his first round match on the night one but committed to compete in his first round match on night two. It prompted PWG to add SB Kento as the eighteenth participant in the tournament and PWG announced that a match would be held on night one to determine Bailey's opponent on night two. On December 15, PWG revealed the list of first-round matches on night one including a three-way match between Bandido, Black Taurus, and El Hijo del Vikingo.

Due to injuries sustained in a match at Wrestle Kingdom 17, Lio Rush was removed from the tournament on January 5 and replaced with the debuting Bryan Keith.

Event

Night One
The Battle of Los Angeles kicked off with a match between Alex Shelley and Masha Slamovich. Slamovich countered a sit-out side powerslam attempt by Shelley into a cradle and pinned him for the win.

Next, SB Kento took on Bryan Keith. Keith hit a knee strike and a powerbomb for the win.

Next, Komander took on Latigo. Komander pinned Latigo with a cradle after a ropewalk shooting star press.

Next, Jonathan Gresham took on Jordynne Grace. Grace countered a European clutch by Gresham into a choke to win via submission. Grace advanced to compete against Mike Bailey in the first round match on the night two.

Next, Aramis took on Shun Skywalker. Skywalker delivered a spinning powerbomb to Aramis for the win.

Next, Konosuke Takeshita took on Michael Oku. Takeshita delivered a jumping knee strike and a running knee strike to Oku for the win.

Next, the World Champion Daniel Garcia took on Titus Alexander. Garcia was disqualified after the referee caught him hitting Alexander with the World Championship title belt.

It was followed by a three-way match between Bandido, Black Taurus, and El Hijo del Vikingo. Bandido delivered a kneeling reverse piledriver to Taurus for the win.

Night Two

The night two opened with the first round match between Mike Bailey and Jordynne Grace. Bailey delivered a Flamingo Driver to Grace for the win.

Quarterfinals
The quarterfinal round of the Battle of Los Angeles began as Konosuke Takeshita took on Titus Alexander. Takeshita delivered a jumping knee strike to Alexander for the win.

Next, Bryan Keith took on Masha Slamovich. Keith delivered a running knee strike to Slamovich for the win.

Next, Bandido took on Komander. Komander delivered a ropewalk shooting star press to Bandido for the win.

Next, Mike Bailey took on Shun Skywalker. Bailey delivered a shooting star press with double knees to Skywalker's chest for the win.

It was followed by a tag team match in which Black Taurus teamed with Latigo to take on Aramis and Rey Horus. Taurus delivered a powerbomb, a backbreaker and a belly-to-back piledriver to Horus for the win.

Semifinals
In the first semifinal match, Konosuke Takeshita defeated Komander by pinning him with a backslide.

Next, Mike Bailey took on Bryan Keith. Bailey delivered a 450° splash with double knees to Keith's back for the win.

It was followed by a ten-man tag team match featuring a surprise appearance by Jericho Appreciation Society (Angelo Parker, Chris Jericho, Daniel Garcia, Matt Menard and Sammy Guevara), thus marking Jericho's surprise PWG debut. Parker and Menard made their surprise returns to PWG after a near fifteen-year absence, having last appeared at the 2008 DDT4 while Guevara also made his surprise PWG return after a four-year absence, having last appeared as a participant in the 2018 Battle of Los Angeles. JAS took on Jonathan Gresham, Kevin Blackwood, Michael Oku, Player Uno and SB Kento. Jericho delivered a Judas Effect to Blackwood for the win.

Final
Mike Bailey took on Konosuke Takeshita in the final of the 2023 Battle of Los Angeles. Bailey delivered a shooting star press and a Flamingo Driver to Takeshita to win the tournament.

Results

Tournament brackets

References

External links
Pro Wrestling Guerrilla official website

2023 in professional wrestling
January 2023 sports events in the United States
Professional wrestling in Los Angeles
Professional wrestling in California
2023 in Los Angeles
Battle of Los Angeles (professional wrestling)
2023 in California